is a Japanese professional footballer who plays as a midfielder for J2 League club Roasso Kumamoto.

Career
Rei Hirakawa joined FC Tokyo in 2016. On October 30, he debuted in J3 League (v SC Sagamihara).

Career statistics

References

External links

Profile at FC Tokyo

2000 births
Living people
Association football midfielders
Association football people from Tokyo
Japan youth international footballers
Japanese footballers
J1 League players
J2 League players
J3 League players
FC Tokyo players
FC Tokyo U-23 players
Kagoshima United FC players
Matsumoto Yamaga FC players
Roasso Kumamoto players